Aloeides egerides, the Red Hill copper, is a species of butterfly in the family Lycaenidae. It is endemic to South Africa, where it is known from coastal fynbos in the Western Cape and Karwyderskraal near Hermanus on the southern coast.

The wingspan is 21–24 mm for males and 22–26 mm females. Adults are on wing from October to December, with a peak in November and from January to April, with a peak in March. There are two generations per year.

References

Aloeides
Insects of South Africa
Butterflies described in 1968
Endemic butterflies of South Africa
Taxonomy articles created by Polbot